Rina Carolina Vásquez Rolín (born 11 September 1997), known as Carolina Rolín, is a Salvadoran footballer who plays as a defender for CD FAS and El Salvador women's national team.

Club career
Rolín has played for FAS in El Salvador.

International career
Rolín capped for El Salvador at senior level during the 2018 CONCACAF Women's Championship qualification.

See also
List of El Salvador women's international footballers

References

1997 births
Living people
Salvadoran women's footballers
Women's association football defenders
El Salvador women's international footballers